The Chiriqui pocket gopher (Heterogeomys cavator) is a species of rodent in the family Geomyidae. It is found in Costa Rica and Panama. Some authors classify it in the genus Orthogeomys, but recent research has allowed this and its related species to be classified in the genus Heterogeomys.

References

Heterogeomys
Gopher, Chiriqui pocket
Mammals described in 1902
Least concern biota of North America
Taxonomy articles created by Polbot